Torrance is a city in the Los Angeles metropolitan area located in Los Angeles County, California, United States. The city is part of what is known as the South Bay region of the metropolitan area. Torrance was incorporated in 1921, and at the 2020 census had a population of 147,067 residents. The city has 30 parks. The city consistently ranks among the safest cities in Los Angeles County. Torrance is also the birthplace of the American Youth Soccer Organization (AYSO).

History

For thousands of years, the area where Torrance is located was part of the Tongva Native American homeland.

It was later divided in 1846, with Governor Pío Pico granting Rancho de los Palos Verdes to José Loreto and Juan Capistrano Sepulveda in the Alta California territory of independent Mexico.

In the early 1900s, real estate developer Jared Sidney Torrance and other investors saw the value of creating a mixed industrial-residential community south of Los Angeles. They purchased part of an old Spanish land grant and hired landscape architect Frederick Law Olmsted Jr. to design a planned community. The resulting town was founded in October 1912 and named after Torrance. The city of Torrance was formally incorporated in May 1921, the townsite initially being bounded by Western Avenue on the east, Del Amo Boulevard on the north, Crenshaw Boulevard on the west, and on the south by Plaza Del Amo east of where it meets Carson Street, and by Carson Street west of where it meets Plaza Del Amo. 

The first residential avenue created in Torrance was Gramercy and the second avenue was Andreo. Many of the houses on these avenues turned 100 years of age in 2012. Both avenues are located in the area referred to as Old Town Torrance. This section of Torrance is under review to be classified as a historical district. Some of the early civic and residential buildings were designed by the renowned and innovative Southern California architect Irving Gill, in his distinctive combining of Mission Revival and early Modernist architecture.

Geography

Torrance is a coastal community in southwestern Los Angeles County sharing the climate and geographical features common to the Greater Los Angeles area. Its boundaries are: Redondo Beach Boulevard and the cities of Lawndale and Gardena to the north; Western Avenue and the Harbor Gateway neighborhood of Los Angeles to the east; the Palos Verdes Hills with the cities of Lomita, Rolling Hills Estates and Palos Verdes Estates on the south; and the Pacific Ocean and the cities of Redondo Beach and Carson to the west. The western portion of Torrance is in ZIP Code 90277 which is a city of Redondo Beach postal address.

Torrance Beach lies between Redondo Beach and Malaga Cove on Santa Monica Bay. The southernmost stretch of Torrance Beach, on a cove at the northern end of the Palos Verdes peninsula, is known to locals as Rat Beach (Right After Torrance).

An urban wetland, the Madrona Marsh is a nature preserve on land once set for oil production and saved from development, with restoration projects enhancing the vital habitat for birds, wildlife, and native plants. 

A nature center provides activities, information, and classes for school children and visitors of all ages.

Climate
Torrance has a warm-summer Mediterranean climate (Köppen: Csb), bordering with a semi-arid climate (Bsk). The rainy season is November through March, as shown in the adjacent table. Summers tend to be warm and humid due to Torrance's proximity to the coast.

The Los Angeles area is also subject to the phenomenon typical of a microclimate. California has also a weather phenomenon called "June Gloom" or "May Gray", which sometimes brings overcast or foggy skies in the morning on the coast, followed by sunny skies by noon during late spring and early summer.

Demographics

2010
The 2010 United States Census reported that Torrance had a population of 145,438. The racial makeup of Torrance was 74,333 (51.1%) White (42.3% Non-Hispanic White), 50,240 (34.5%) Asian, 3,955 (2.7%) African American, 554 (0.4%) Native American, 530 (0.4%) Pacific Islander, 7,808 (5.4%) from other races, and 8,018 (5.5%) from two or more races. There were 23,440 Hispanic or Latino residents, of any race (16.1%).

The Census reported that 144,292 people (99.2% of the population) lived in households, 506 (0.3%) homeless who lived in non-institutionalized group quarters, and 640 (0.4%) were institutionalized.

There were 56,001 households, out of which 18,558 (33.1%) had children under the age of 18 living in them, 29,754 (53.1%) were opposite-sex married couples living together, 6,148 (11.0%) had a female householder with no husband present, 2,510 (4.5%) had a male householder with no wife present.  There were 2,152 (3.8%) unmarried opposite-sex partnerships, and 309 (0.6%) same-sex married couples or partnerships. 14,472 households (25.8%) were made up of individuals, and 5,611 (10.0%) had someone living alone who was 65 years of age or older. The average household size was 2.58.  There were 38,412 families (68.6% of all households); the average family size was 3.14.

The population was spread out, with 31,831 people (21.9%) under the age of 18, 10,875 people (7.5%) aged 18 to 24, 38,296 people (26.3%) aged 25 to 44, 42,710 people (29.4%) aged 45 to 64, and 21,726 people (14.9%) who were 65 years of age or older.  The median age was 41.3 years. For every 100 females, there were 94.7 males.  For every 100 females age 18 and over, there were 91.8 males.

The homeowner vacancy rate was 0.8%; the rental vacancy rate was 5.3%.  85,308 people (58.7% of the population) lived in owner-occupied housing units, and 58,984 people (40.6%) lived in rental housing units.

As of March 2019, Torrance had a median household income of $85,070 and a median family income of $102,637.

It also has the second-highest percentage of residents of Japanese ancestry in California (8.9%), after the neighboring city of Gardena.

2000
As of the census of 2000, there were 137,946 people, 54,542 households, and 36,270 families residing in the city. The population density was 6,715.7 inhabitants per square mile (2,593.1/km2). The racial makeup of the city was 59.2% White, 28.6% Asian, 2.2% Black or African American, 0.4% Native American, 0.4% Pacific Islander, 4.6% from other races, and 4.7% from two or more races. 12.8% of the population were Hispanic or Latino of any race.

There were 54,542 households, out of which 31.1% had children under the age of 18 living with them, 52.1% were married couples living together, 10.3% had a female householder with no husband present, and 33.5% were non-families. 27.5% of all households were made up of individuals, and 9.1% had someone living alone who was 65 years of age or older.  The average household size was 2.51 and the average family size was 3.10.

In the city, the population was spread out, with 23.0% under the age of 18, 6.8% from 18 to 24, 32.4% from 25 to 44, 23.8% from 45 to 64, and 14.1% who were 65 years of age or older.  The median age was 39 years. For every 100 females, there were 94.7 males.  For every 100 females age 18 and over, there were 91.5 males.

The median income for a household in the city in 2008 was $79,312, and the median income for a family was $98,473. Males had a median income of $50,606 versus $36,334 for females. The per capita income for the city was $39,118.  About 4.7% of families and 5.4% of the population were below the poverty line, including 5.7% of those under age 18 and 7.4% of those age 65 or over.

Japanese-Americans

As of 2014, the City of Torrance has the second largest concentration of ethnic Japanese people of any U.S. city, after Honolulu. The city has headquarters of Japanese automakers and offices of other Japanese companies. Because of this many Japanese restaurants and other Japanese cultural offerings are in the city, and Willy Blackmore of L.A. Weekly wrote that Torrance was "essentially Japan's 48th prefecture". A Mitsuwa supermarket, Japanese schools, and Japanese banks serve the community.

In the pre-World War II period, the South Bay region was one of the few areas that allowed non-U.S. citizens to acquire property, so a Japanese presence came. According to John Kaji, a Torrance resident quoted in Public Radio International who was the son of Toyota's first American-based accountant, the Japanese corporate presence in Torrance, beginning with Toyota, attracted many ethnic Japanese. Toyota moved its operations to its Torrance campus in 1982 because of its proximity to the Port of Long Beach and Los Angeles International Airport, and it was followed by many other Japanese companies. In 2014, Toyota announced it was moving its U.S. headquarters to Plano, Texas.

Korean-Americans

, about 60% of the Korean population in the South Bay region lived in Torrance and Gardena. In 1990, 5,888 ethnic Koreans lived in Torrance, a 256% increase from the 1980 figure of 1,652 ethnic Koreans.

Economy
Torrance is home to the U.S. headquarters of Japanese automaker American Honda Motor Company and its luxury vehicle division, Acura. Robinson Helicopters are designed and built in Torrance as are Honeywell's Garrett turbochargers, used on automobile engines worldwide. Alcoa Fastening Systems (now known as Arconic) is headquartered in Torrance, producing aerospace fasteners. Pacific Sales, Pelican Products, Virco, and Rapiscan Systems are among the other companies based in Torrance.

According to the city's 2021 Annual Comprehensive Financial Report, the city's top 10 employers (by number of employees) are:

The Del Amo Fashion Center, at 2.5 million square feet (232,000 m2), is one of the five largest malls in the United States by gross leasable area.  The current mall was created when Del Amo Center, built in 1958, merged with Del Amo Fashion Square, built in 1972.  Once located on opposite sides of Carson Street, an expansion of the mall spanning Carson Street joined the two centers by 1982, making it the largest mall in the world at the time.  In 2005, the east end of the original mall north of Carson Street was demolished to make way for a new open-air shopping center, opened in mid-September, 2006. This was followed in 2015 by the opening of an expanded northern Fashion Wing, with Nordstrom as the mall anchor and supplemented by luxury retailers such as Kate Spade, Hugo Boss, Uniqlo, Michael Kors, and Ben Bridge. The Old Towne Mall was an entertainment-themed mall operating in the 1970s.

As a major oil-producing region, Torrance was once dotted with thousands of oil wells and oil derricks.  Though the oil wells are not as common as they once were, the Torrance oil refinery owned by PBF Energy in the north end of the city is responsible for much of Southern California's gasoline supply. Torrance was an important hub and shop site of the Pacific Electric Railway.

Torrance has a general aviation airport, originally named simply "Torrance Airport" and since renamed Zamperini Field after local track star, World War II hero and Torrance High graduate Louis Zamperini. The airport handles approximately 175,000 annual take-offs and landings (473 per day), down from the 1974 record of 428,000 operations. Airport noise abatement is a major local issue. In 2007 the Western Museum of Flight moved to Zamperini Field.

Torrance is also home to the main bakery facility for King's Hawaiian, the dominant brand of Hawaiian bread in North America. Younger Optics, Torrance's 10th-largest employer, created the first seamless or "invisible" bifocal.

The headquarters of Mitsuwa Marketplace and Nijiya Market are both located in Torrance.

Operations of foreign companies
All Nippon Airways operates its United States headquarters, a customer relations and services office, in Torrance.

The Toyota Motor Company of Japan established a U.S. headquarters on October 31, 1957, at a former Rambler dealership in Hollywood.  Toyota sold 287 Toyopet Crowns and one Land Cruiser during the company's first year of U.S. operation. It moved Toyota Motor Sales USA operations to Torrance in 1982,  because of easy access to port facilities and the LAX airport. In 2013, it sold 2.2 million vehicles in the U.S. In 2014, it announced it would move 3,000 of its white-collar employees to Plano, Texas to be closer to its American factories. Numerous other Japanese firms followed Toyota to Los Angeles, because of its location and its reputation as the national trend-setter.

The Los Angeles South Bay area, as of 2014, has the largest concentration of Japanese companies in the United States.

Arts and culture

The Armed Forces Day Parade in Torrance, which was first produced in 1960, is the longest-running military parade sponsored by a city. It is held annually on Armed Forces Day, and runs down Torrance Boulevard. The parade features military vehicles, school bands, and prominent community members.

The Torrance Cultural Arts Center hosts cultural events year-round.  In partnership with the City of Torrance, the Torrance Cultural Arts Foundation (TOCA) provides diverse cultural, educational and entertainment experiences. Additional performances are provided by the Torrance Performing Arts Consortium, including The Aerospace Players, Torrance Art Museum, Los Cancioneros Master Chorale, South Bay Ballet, South Bay Conservatory, and The Torrance Symphony.

In the 2010 Rose Parade, City of Torrance's entry won the top Lathrop K. Leishman trophy for its Garden of Dreams float, judged as the "Most Beautiful Non-Commercial" float.
In 2011, Torrance won the Tournament Volunteers' Trophy for best floral design of parade theme under 35 feet in length.
In 2012, the city's entry won the Governor's Trophy for best depiction of life in California.
In 2015, an entry honoring Rose Parade Grand Marshal Louis Zamperini won the Theme trophy for excellence in presenting parade theme.
In 2016, the City of Torrance float won the Princess trophy for most beautiful float 35 feet and under.

Historic landmarks
These Torrance landmarks are on the National Register of Historic Places:
 Main Building (Torrance High School) – Mediterranean Revival architecture, 1917 and 1921
 Original Science Building – Current Home Economics Building (Torrance High School)
 Auditorium (Torrance High School) – Streamline Moderne, 1938
 Torrance Elementary School – Current High School Annex – Mediterranean Revival
 Pacific Electric Railroad Bridge – designed by Irving Gill, 1913

Parks and recreation

City parks

The Torrance City Parks Department directs and maintains the thirty Torrance City Parks. They include:
 Wilson Park – the  park has picnic and sports facilities, including a gymnasium, skatepark, and roller-hockey rink. Wilson Park also hosts the Torrance Farmers Market.
 The Southern California Live Steamers Miniature Railroad is located at the Southeast corner of Charles H. Wilson Park. Free train rides on actual miniature live steam trains are given on the first Sunday and third Saturday of each month and the 4th of July. SCLS was one of the first live steam clubs in California started in 1946 with original members like Walt Disney, Olie Johnston and Ward Kimball all of Disney fame. The club moved to Torrance in 1986 after leaving the Lomita Railway Museum property.
 Madrona Marsh Wildlife Preserve & Nature Center – a rare Southern California wetlands habitat with higher Coastal sage community native plants areas, wildlife and birdwatching, and a Nature center with natural gardens classes.
 Columbia Park – the large recreational urban regional park has picnic areas, field sports facilities, walking paths, jogging trails, and a competitive cross country running racecourse. The cherry blossom tree grove, part of Living Tree Dedication program, is in Columbia Park.
 Torrance Smart Gardening Center – Columbia Park features a Community Garden providing planting beds and "community" for residents. It is one of twelve county-operated Smart Gardening Centers around the region. Columbia Park additionally serves as home to the Home Garden Learning Center, and is a backyard composting demonstration center provided by Los Angeles County.
 Living Tribute Trees park program – The Torrance Parks Living Dedication Tree Program is coordinated and by the city, so that families, individuals, and groups can sponsor the planting of a new tree in the park to honor a person or commemorate an event with a living tribute Tree Dedication.
 Torrance Beach Park, and the beach along the Pacific Coast of Torrance, known as "RAT Beach".
 Marvin Braude Bike Trail (The Strand), a paved bicycle path that runs mostly along the Pacific Ocean shoreline in Los Angeles County, ends there.

Government

Local government
The City of Torrance is a charter city.  The original city charter was voted on and ratified by the qualified electors at an election held August 20, 1946, and filed with the Secretary of State January 7, 1947.  The elective officers of the city are the mayor, six members of the City Council, five members of the Board of Education, the City Clerk and the City Treasurer.

Using the council-manager form of government, the City Council, as the elected body, adopts legislation, sets policy, adjudicates issues, and establishes the budget of the city.  The City Council appoints the City Manager and the City Attorney. The city has 13 appointed boards and commissions which advise the council on matters of concern to local residents, such as the city airport, arts, parks, and libraries.

State and federal representation

Postal service
The United States Postal Service operates the Torrance Post Office at 2510 Monterey Street, the Marcelina Post Office at 1433 Marcelina Avenue, the Walteria Post Office at 4216 Pacific Coast Highway, the North Torrance Post Office at 18080 Crenshaw Boulevard, and the Del Amo Post Office at 291 Del Amo Fashion Square.  Zip codes 90277, 90501, 90503, 90504, 90505.

Healthcare
There are two major hospitals in Torrance: Torrance Memorial Medical Center and Little Company of Mary Hospital.  A third hospital, Los Angeles County Department of Health Services Harbor-UCLA Medical Center, lies just outside the city limits  (in unincorporated West Carson).

The Los Angeles County Department of Health Services operates the Torrance Health Center in Harbor Gateway, Los Angeles.

Fire
 Torrance Fire Department staffs seven Engine Companies, five Paramedic Rescue Squads, and two Truck Companies.  The department operates out of six Fire Stations providing Fire and EMS coverage for the City and Mutual Aid to the surrounding communities. Torrance Memorial Medical Center, Little Company of Mary Hospital, Harbor-UCLA Medical Center, Kaiser Hospital-South Bay, and Memorial Hospital of Gardena are receiving hospitals for residents in Torrance who call 911 for medical assistance. The department is a Class 1 rated Fire Department, the Fire Chief is Martin Serna. Ambulance transportation is provided through McCormick Ambulance.

Police
 Torrance Police Department provides 24-hour law enforcement coverage to the city. The department is broken down into four major divisions, each with its own subdivisions. The department has one main station located at the Civic Center near City Hall. It houses the administrative offices, the city jail, and the public safety dispatch center. The department works closely with other local law enforcement agencies for training and SWAT operations. The police chief is Jeremiah Hart.
 Torrance operates its own 911 dispatch center located at the police station, and is responsible for all 911 calls originating in Torrance. The communications center answers emergency and non-emergency calls and requests for assistance in addition to dispatching for both the Fire and Police Departments.

Public library
The City of Torrance operates a main library facility (named after former mayor Katy Geissert) in the city Civic Center, plus five branches at locations throughout the city.

Transportation
Highways and freeways in the region include I-110, I-405, SR 91, SR 107, and SR 1. The city is served by Torrance Transit, LACMTA Metro bus, and LADOT services.

Zamperini Field (IATA: TOA ICAO: KTOA) is a general aviation airport. Commercial airlines service is within 15 minutes at Los Angeles International Airport and Long Beach Airport.

Rail 
Torrance is served by BNSF and Union Pacific.

BNSF operates on the former Atchison, Topeka & Santa Fe Railway Harbor Subdivision line originally built in the 1920s. AT&SF was merged with Burlington Northern in 1996 to form BNSF.

Union Pacific currently operates what is left of the Pacific Electric's San Pedro via Gardena Line and Torrance Loop Line both built in 1911 (passenger service was provided until 1940, afterwards only the Torrance shop train was operated for employees). The Pacific Electric Torrance Shops were completed in 1918 and closed in 1955 two years after all passenger service was taken over by Los Angeles Metropolitan Transit Authority. Freight operations were taken over by PE's parent company, Southern Pacific, in 1965. SP was merged into UP in 1996.

LA Metro Rail plans to complete the C Line Extension to Torrance from Redondo Beach sometime between 2030 and 2033, though there are plans to speed this up as part of the Twenty-eight by '28 initiative so it can be done by the 2028 Olympics.

Education

Primary and secondary schools

Public schools

Torrance Unified School District (TUSD) was established in 1947 and unified in 1948. The district comprises the City of Torrance, bordered by the Palos Verdes Peninsula on the south, the cities of Redondo Beach and Gardena on the north, the City of Los Angeles (Harbor Gateway) on the east and the Pacific Ocean on the west.

The Torrance Unified School District's five high schools are:
 Torrance High School
 North High School
 South High School
 West High School
 Kurt Shery High School (continuation)

The Torrance Unified School District's eight middle schools are:
 Calle Mayor Middle School
 Casimir Middle School
 Bert Lynn Middle School
 J.H. Hull Middle School
 Jefferson Middle School
 Madrona Middle School
 Philip Magruder Middle School
 Richardson Middle School

The Torrance Unified School District's 17 elementary schools are:
 Hickory Elementary School
 John Adams Elementary School
 Torrance Elementary School
 Howard Wood Elementary School
 Anza Elementary School
 Arlington Elementary School
 Arnold Elementary School
 Carr Elementary School
 Yukon Elementary School
 Walteria Elementary School
 Riviera Elementary School
 Towers Elementary School
 Fern Elementary School
 Edison Elementary School
 Lincoln Elementary School
 Seaside Elementary School
 Victor Elementary School
Area districts have created the Southern California Regional Occupational Center (SCROC) to teach technical classes to their students and to local adults. TUSD is a participant feeder district of the California Academy of Mathematics and Science or CAMS, a mathematics and science magnet high school, administered by the Long Beach Unified School District.

Private schools
Torrance also has several private schools. Catholic schools under the Roman Catholic Archdiocese of Los Angeles include Bishop Montgomery High School, Nativity Catholic School, St James Catholic School and St Catherine Laboure Catholic School. Protestant private schools include Ascension Lutheran School and First Lutheran School. Pacific Lutheran High School is in Gardena. Other area schools include: Riviera Hall Lutheran School, Riviera Methodist School, and South Bay Junior Academy.

In 1980 the Lycée Français de Los Angeles bought the  former Parkway School property, located in the Hollywood Riviera section of Torrance, from TUSD. This property became the Lycee's Torrance campus, and as of February 1990 the campus had 100 students. In November 1989 the Lycee sold the property for $2.65 million to Manhattan Holding Co. and scheduled to transfer the students to its West Los Angeles campuses. As of February 1990 neighbors of the campus site were asking the City of Torrance to not modify the zoning of this property. The Lycee stated that the campus closed due to low enrollment.

At one time, Coast Christian Schools (now Valor Christian Academy) maintained a high school campus in Torrance.

Colleges and universities
Torrance is in the El Camino Community College District, although the campus of El Camino College is just outside the city limits in unincorporated El Camino Village. As of 2011, the college enrolls over 25,000 students each semester.

Miscellaneous education
In 1980, Asahi Gakuen, a weekend Japanese-language education institution, began renting space in South Torrance High School. The school continues to use the school for its Torrance Campus (トーランス校 Tōransu-kō).

Media
The Los Angeles Times is the metropolitan area's newspaper.

The Daily Breeze, a 70,000-circulation daily newspaper, is published in Torrance. It serves the South Bay cities of Los Angeles County.  Its slogan is "LAX to LA Harbor". Herald Publications, media group started the Torrance Tribune, a community newspaper, which was started November 2010, it has a distribution of 15,000 newspapers to single-family homes and businesses in the City of Torrance.

Torrance CitiCABLE, shown on KNET 25.2, Spectrum 3, Frontier FiOS 31 is the government access channel.  Programming includes news, sports, entertainment, information, public affairs, and city council meetings.

Notable people

 Albert Isen, first directly-elected mayor
 Jason "Wee-Man" Acuña, TV host and actor
 Guillermo "Memo" Arzate, former professional soccer player
 Bela Bajaria, Netflix Chief Content Officer, Time 100 Most Influential People (2022); attended Torrance High
 Brian Bonsall, actor in Blank Check (1994 Disney film)
 Jonathan Bornstein (born 1984), soccer left back/midfielder (Chicago Fire FC and national team)
 John Butler, leader of the John Butler Trio
 Brandon Call, actor on Step by Step
 Larry Carlton, guitarist
 John Chiang, California State Controller
 Kraig Chiles, professional soccer player for the San Diego Sockers
 Roger Clinton, half-brother of President Bill Clinton
 Chase d'Arnaud, former Major League Baseball player 
 Peter Daut, news anchor, KCBS-TV
 Rosemary Decamp, actress
 Chris Demaria, former MLB pitcher for the Royals and Brewers
 Bo Derek, actress
 Michael Dudikoff, actor
 Bobby East, NASCAR driver
 Ryan Ellis, NASCAR driver
 Whitney Engen, player for the United States women's national soccer team
 Carla Esparza, mixed martial artist; former UFC strawweight champion
 Kellen Goff, voice actor
 Ben Going, YouTube celebrity
 Tony Gonzalez, retired tight end for the Atlanta Falcons; 11-time Pro Bowl selection
 Rorion Gracie & Royce Gracie, mixed martial arts practitioners and UFC fighters
 Bart Johnson, retired MLB pitcher
 Parnelli Jones, USAC driver and his son, P. J. Jones, IRL driver
 Spike Jonze, director, producer, screenwriter and actor; part owner of skateboard company Girl Skateboards
 Fred Kendall, former MLB catcher and manager
 Jason Kendall, former MLB catcher
 Dave Kerman, drummer
 Chloe Kim, professional snowboarder, 2018 Winter Olympics gold medalist
 Kevin Kim, professional tennis player
 Jennifer Kita, Angel/Lil Angel of the Harajuku Girls
 Alix Klineman (born 1989), volleyball player
 Scott Kolden, actor
 Michelle Kwan, 5-time world figure skating champion and Olympian
 Dave LaRoche, former MLB pitcher; father of MLB players Adam LaRoche and Andy LaRoche
 Jennifer Lee (TOKiMONSTA), electronic music producer and DJ
 Ted Lieu, Democratic Party, U.S. Representative for California's 33rd congressional district
 Ted Lilly, retired MLB starting pitcher
 Jeremy Lin, professional basketball player
 Nancy Lopez, Hall of Fame professional golfer
 Joyce Manor, emo/punk band
 Brandon Manumaleuna, NFL tight end for the Chicago Bears
 Rami Malek, actor
 Antonio Margarito, Mexican-American professional boxer
 Francisco Mendoza, MLS player
 Alyson and Amanda Michalka (Aly & AJ), singers and actresses
 Justin Miller, MLB pitcher
 Ethan Moreau, former Los Angeles Kings hockey player
 Lisa Moretti, WWE's "Ivory"
 Chad Morton, NFL player
 Johnnie Morton, former NFL player
 Paul Moyer, television news broadcaster
 George Nakano, California politician
 Don Newcombe, former Los Angeles Dodgers pitcher; first winner of Rookie of the Year, MVP, and Cy Young awards
 Steve Nguyen, director, producer, and screenwriter
 Chuck Norris, karate expert and actor; raised in Torrance; opened his first dojo in Torrance
 Amy Okuda, actress
 Brian Ortega, mixed martial artist
 the Pedregon family, professional drag racers Frank Sr., Cruz, Frank Jr., and Tony
 Greg Popovich, founder and owner of Castle Rock Winery
 Jolene Purdy, actress, best known for role in Under the Dome as Dodee
 Daryl Sabara & Evan Sabara, actors (Spy Kids and Keeping Up with the Steins)
 Adán Sánchez, Mexican-American corrido singer
 Steve Sarkisian, former USC football head coach
 Sigi Schmid, LA Galaxy head coach
 Skip Schumaker, MLB outfielder
 Justin Shenkarow, actor
 Bud Smith, retired MLB player; threw no-hitter in his rookie season (2001)
 Snoop Dogg, rapper, actor; owns mansion in Hollywood Riviera neighborhood
 Joe Stevenson, mixed martial arts practitioner and UFC fighter
 Jack Stewart, soccer player, Carolina RailHawks in USL-1
 Royle Stillman, MLB outfielder
 William Suff, serial killer
 Quentin Tarantino, filmmaker
 Ron Taylor, film and television actor, pro basketball player (ABA and Austrian League)
 Tyrone Taylor, center fielder for the Milwaukee Brewers
 Deon Thompson, North Carolina Tar Heels basketball player
 Connor Tingley, artist
 Billy Traber, Major League Baseball pitcher
 Tiffany van Soest, kickboxer
 Janeene Vickers, 1992 Barcelona Olympics medalist
 Chauncey Washington, former NFL running back
 Glen Walker, NFL player
 J. Warner Wallace, homicide detective and Christian apologist
 David Wells, former MLB pitcher
 Paul Westphal, NBA player and former head coach
 Ryan Wheeler, MLB third baseman
 Denzel Whitaker, actor
 John White, CFL player
 Steven Wright, starting pitcher for Boston Red Sox
 Louis Zamperini, 1936 Olympic track star, World War II veteran, author, speaker; subject of Unbroken
 Latrice Royale, drag queen; best known for competing on the fourth season of RuPaul's Drag Race and the fourth season of RuPaul's Drag Race All Stars

Sister cities
In 1973, Torrance established a sister-city relationship with Kashiwa, Chiba, Japan, as part of the Sister Cities International program.  Since then, citizens of Torrance have regularly engaged in cultural exchange with Kashiwa through the guidance of the Torrance Sister City Association, which facilitates a Japanese cultural festival, a yearly student exchange program, and contact between officials of the two cities. North High is the official sister high school of Kashiwa Municipal High.

See also

References

External links

 
 Discover Torrance the Official Visitors Bureau for Torrance, California
 City-Data.com: Torrance information page

 
1912 establishments in California
1921 establishments in California
Cities in Los Angeles County, California
Incorporated cities and towns in California
Populated coastal places in California
Populated places established in 1912
Populated places established in 1921
South Bay, Los Angeles
Surfing locations in California